

See also
List of politicians from Bihar

References

India MPs 2019–present
Lok Sabha members from Bihar
Living people
Janata Dal (United) politicians
People from Madhubani district
1956 births